Naval Base Manila, Naval Air Base Manila was a major United States Navy base south of the City of Manila, on Luzon Island in the Philippines.  Some of the bases dates back to 1898, the end of the Spanish–American War. Starting in 1938 civilian contractors were used to build new facilities in Manila to prepare for World War II. Work stopped on December 23, 1941, when Manila was declared not defendable against the Empire of Japan southward advance, which took over the city on January 2, 1942, after the US declared it an open city. US Navy construction and repair started in March 1945 with the taking of Manila in the costly Battle of Manila ending on March 2, 1945. Naval Base Manila supported the Pacific War and remained a major US Naval Advance Base until its closure in 1971.

History
The first US Navy bases were Spain's bases taken after the 1898 Battle of Manila. At the end of the Spanish–American War, Spain ceded Manila to the United States. Merchants ship from Spain and China started trading on the Sangley Peninsula in 1571. Sangley was the name given to Chinese traders, a merchant guest, in the Philippines. The two main Naval bases taken: Naval Base Cavite at Cavite City and Naval Station Sangley Point both on the Cavite Peninsula in Manila Bay, eight miles southwest of the city of Manila. The Cavite Peninsula is south of the city center of Manila. On May 1, 1898, the US Navy took over the two Naval Bases after the Battle of Manila Bay. Naval Station Sangley Point was used as a coal station for refueling ships. At the Naval Base Cavite, a repair shipyard, that Spain had called Astillero de Rivera (Rivera Shipyard), the US Navy did updates, improvements and later added a submarine base. The old Spanish hospital, run by Sisters of Charity, was taken over by the US Navy. The old hospital was replaced by a new Naval hospital, Cañacao Naval Hospital Reservation in the 1920s, this Hospital served the Navy and local population. Cañacao Naval Hospital was destroyed during the war. Starting in 1938 US and Philippines civilian contractors were used to build up the US bases at Manila. The new 1941 projects were building at Sangley Point a Seaplane base and an ammunition depot at Mariveles on the tip of Bataan Peninsula.

On December 23, 1941 it was declared that Manila was not defendable. Most civilian contractors depart Manila. US Troop were withdrawn to the Bataan Peninsula. Some Troops withdrawn to Corregidor Island in the bay, that surrendered May 6, 1942. Japanese forces took over and started using the two Manila bases in January 1942.  US civilians that did not depart were detained by Japan at University of Santo Tomas-(Santo Tomas Internment Camp) and Bilibid Prisons. The University of Santo Tomas prisoner of war (POW) camp held 3,000. The two Bilibid Prisons were used as processing centers, over 13,000 POWs, mostly Americans, were held there before being put on hell ships and transferred to other POW camps. Some staff at the Naval Hospital did not evacuate, including some nurses, who became POWs with the Troops in the Battle of Bataan. The nurses became known as the Angels of Bataan for their care of the Troop till liberated in February 1945.

With the taking of Manila in 1945, in March 1945 the US Navy's Seabee, Naval Construction Battalions, began repairing the battle damage at the two bases. Soon improvement began, with new Troop arriving at Pacific War, a base for new Troops arriving was built at the Cavite naval base. With the fighting ships at war for years, a Cavite repair base and depot was built for the repair and maintenance of ships.  United States Seventh Fleet headquarters moved into the 40-acre Manila Polo Club.  At Sangley Point Seabees built a new 5,000-foot runway for Naval Air Transport Service airfield. The new airfield had 12,000 barrel tank farm, hangars, and a depot. Sangley Point seaplane base was repaired and improved, including adding a pontoon dock. The Cavite base was repaired and a new replacement Naval hospital was built. The Manila bases and the large Fleet anchorage in Manila Bay began to build up for the expected costly invasion of Japan, planned for November 1, 1945, called Operation Downfall. With the Surrender of Japan on September 2, 1945, the invasion was not needed. The new Naval Hospital was completed and expanded. Naval Base Manila continued as US Base till 1971, when it was turned over to the Philippines Navy.

Bases and facilities

Naval Station Sangley Point 341-acres (1898–1941, 1945–1971) (Spain 1884–1898)
Naval Air Station Sangley Point (341-acres NAB Manila) 8,000-foot runway (1945–1971) now Danilo Atienza Air Base. The Navy operated Lockheed P-2 Neptune, Lockheed P-3 Orion, Martin P4M Mercator from 1945 to 1950.
Cañacao Peninsula Seaplane Base at Sangley Point (1941) Patrol Wing 10) (Japan 1941–1945 Kanakao base), US Navy (1945–1971). The Navy operated patrol planes: P5M Marlin, HU-16 Albatross, and PBY Catalina at the base. The Seaplane Base closed in 1965 and is now part of Sangley Point National High School. Navy operated
Naval Fuel depot at Sangley Point (1938–1941, 1945–1971)
(replaced Spain's 1875 Hospital)
Radio station at Sangley Point, Three 600-foot steel antenna towers (1915–1945). Removed to built 8,000-foot runway.
Crash boat base
US Coast Guard Air Station Sangley Point, US Coast Guard run LORAN, long-range navigation (1946–1970)
United States Marine Corps Camp (1945–1970)
John Paul Jones School at Sangley Point opened for children of base staff (1945–1971)
Power plant
Sangley Point Ship Yard, two marine railways for ship repair, next to the seaplane base.
Varadero de Manila Shipyard, (1957–1970) the US Navy shipyard at Sangley Point was turned over for private use after the Korean war in 1957. Now a boat dock.
Naval Base Cavite (50-acre Cavite Navy Yard and Sub Base) (1898–1941, 1945–1971), now Naval Station Pascual Ledesma
Cavite Submarine base (1919-1960s)
Cavite Naval Fuel depot
Torpedo repair shop
PT boat Base (Squadron 3, 1940–1941) (1945–1946)
Ammunition depot
Cavite ship repair, ship repair and salvage, one boat marine railway (1925–1941, 1945–1971)
Power plant
Cavite Naval Hospital (1945–1971) at 
Mariveles Naval Section Base opened July 22, 1941.
Ammunition depot at Mariveles on the tip of Bataan Peninsula 
Mariveles Naval Port, the bay at Mariveles had an anti-submarine net to protect the ship there. (1941, 1945–1971) Net layers:USS Buckeye, USS Silverbell (AN-51)
Mariveles Quarantine Hospital, now Mariveles Mariveles Mental Wellness and General Hospital
Supply depot – tank farm
Mariveles Airfield, one dirt 3,800-foot runway at Bataan  complete on February 23, 1942. Used by US Army and Navy, with nearby Army Camp. Mariveles Airfield surrendered on April 10, 1942 and from there the Bataan Death March began. Airfield was retaken in February 1945.
Submarine Squadron 2
US Army camp
Radar stations
Mess halls and Barracks at all three bases
Corregidor Island in Manila Bay (1941–1942), two Naval docks, lost in Battle of Corregidor, retaken in 1945.
Malinta Tunnel, built by the United States, from 1922 to 1932 as a bomb-proof storage depot and Troop bunker. Due to many wounded troops a 1,000-bed hospital was added.
Harbor Defenses of Manila and Subic Bays, four US Army forts on islands at the entrance to Manila Bay. Naval mines blocked the entrance to the Port of Manila and Manila Bay for protection. On the north side of Corregidor Island, the two mines fields could be electrically be turned on and off by controls on Corregidor Island, so US ships could use the bay safely.
US Navy Cryptologist Admiral Ernest J. King and other Naval intelligence personnel were taken off Corregidor by submarines on April 8, 1942.  
Key personnel were taken off the Corregidor in Operation Flight Gridiron by two Consolidated PBY Catalina from Naval Base Perth on April 29, 1942. The mission was one of the longer rescue missions ever.
Manila Bay Naval Fleet anchorage (1898–1941, 1945–1971) (once obstacles cleared in 1945)
Port of Manila for supply depot and shore leave. (1898–1941, 1945–1971)
Naval supply depot in the City of Manila (1898–1941, 1945–1971)
Sternberg General Hospital in Manila (US 1898–1941), destroyed during the war.
Manila Army and Navy Club (1925–1941) (Japan 1941–1945)
Bilibid Prison (1945–1946), used by the US to hold Japanese accused of war crimes, Tomoyuki Yamashita was held at the Prison till execution.
Manila Hotel used both by US and Japan during the war.
U.S. Naval Radio Facility Bagobantay (1945–1962)
Fleets:
United States Asiatic Fleet parts stationed at Manila (1902–1907, 1910–1942)
United States Asiatic Fleet's Station CAST intelligence and radio (1938–1942) 
Motor Torpedo Boat Squadron Three (1941–1942)
Submarine tenders Ships:USS B-1, USS B-2 and USS B-3
United States Seventh Fleet headquarters, in the former 40-acre Manila Polo Club (1945)
Fleet Post Office FPO# 3142 SF Manila

Naval Base Manila repair base
Naval Base Manila was a major repair base, bases at the repair facilities:

 Marine railways as dry docks
Repair docks and piers
Service Squadron
Part depots
Machine shops
Engineering camp 
Chemical Engineering Camp
Small boat pool 
Motor pool
USS Jason (AC-12)
USS Beaver
USS Medusa (AR-1)
USS Rigel (AD-13)
USS Leyte (ARG-8)
USS Holland (AS-3)
USS Obstructor
USS Wright (AV-1)
USS Currituck (AV-7)
USS Salisbury Sound (AV-13)
USS Gardiners Bay (AVP-39)

Auxiliary Airfields

Manila auxiliary airfields:

Bataan Airfield on the east side of Bataan Peninsula, built in 1941. Used by US Army and Navy, surrendered April 10, 1942, POWs part of Bataan Death March.
Nichols Field built in	1919, used for maintenance of US Army and US Navy aircraft. Lost in war, used again in 1945 for Army and Naval Air Transport Service (NATS) till 1947. Now Villamor Air Base.
Nielson Field, a private airport built in 1937, was taken over in 1941 for defense, but lost to Japan. Used by US (APO 75) in 1945 and returned to civil use in 1946, but closed in 1947, now part of Ayala Museum.
Closed after war.
Mandaluyong East Airfield in Mandaluyong, built by Japan, US did not develop, now Wack Wack Golf and Country Club, with a Mitsubishi A6M Zero on the grounds.
Grace Park Airfield, (Manila North Airfield) built by Japan, US did not develop, used by US Army and as an emergency runway (1945) at  now at Rizal Avenue, a city block in Caloocan.
Dewey Boulevard Airfield built by Japan, US did not develop as it is a waterfront road, used shortly to remove planes, at Ermita, near US Embassy, that was used as part of the "Airfield" to park planes.
Naval Base Manila helped liberate an inland civil runway, Marikina Airfield in the city of Marikina in 1945. The runway was converted into a sports field.

Seabee units

Seabee units working at Naval Base Manila:
     
12th Naval Construction Regiment
77th Battalion
119th Battalion
ACORN-45

Losses

Bataan Death March 1941: 5,500 to 18,650 POW deaths, of 60,000 and 80,000 Manila US Troops, US Medical staff and Filipino Troops.
Battle of Manila in 1945: US Troop killed 1,010, US Troops wounded 5,565, Japan Troops killed +16,665, and Manila civilians killed +100,000.
Ships and boats losses at Manila:
Scuttled by her crew so Japan could not use: USS Dewey (YFD-1), USS Canopus (AS-9), Yacht Maryann, Tug TT Vaga, USS Sara Thompson (AO-8), Yacht Perry, Fisheries II, SS Capillo, SS Bohol, SS Dos Hermanos, SS Magallanes, SS Montanes, USS Canopus, USS Luzon (PG-47), USS Oahu, USS Quail, USS Napa (AT-32), USS Mindanao (PR-8), USS Bittern (AM-36), USS Bittern (AM-36), USAMP Col. George F. E. Harrison, USS Genesee refloated by Japan, USS Sealion (SS-195), USS Grayling (SS-209), USS YMS-48, Mambukai and PT boats: PT-31, PT-32, PT-33, PT-35, PT-41, Q-112, Q-113 and Q-111.
Sank in action: USS Pigeon (ASR-6), USS YAG-4, USS Tanager (AM-5), Trabajador, USS Grayling (SS-209), USS Neptune, Tug Henry Keswick, SS Bisayas, SS Daylite, Henry Keswick, SS Anakan, USLHT Canlaon, USLHT Banahao, USS Pompey, SS Kaiping, S Mauban, SS Hai Kwang, SS Seistan, SS Palawan, SS Ethel Edwards, USS Si Kiang, SS Tantalus, SS Samal, SS Paz, USS Manatawny, LCS(L)(3)-7, LCS(L)(3)-26, LCS(L)(3)-49, SS Viscaya, SS Corregidor, USS Finch (AM-9) (refloated by Japan), Q-114, and PT-34.
Damaged: USS Fletcher (DD-445), Tug Ranger and USS Hopewell (DD-681) hit in 1945.

Captured: Yacht BRP Banahaw

Post war
On March 3, 1945, Manila is declared liberated, the month of fighting left over 100,000 civilians killed, 1,010 US Troops killed and over 16,665 Japanese Troops killed. The battle is part of the Philippines campaign (1944–1945) and Battle of Luzon. General Akira Mutō is convicted and executed Mutō on December 23, 1948, for war crimes. General Tomoyuki Yamashita is convicted of war crimes and executed on February 23, 1946. Naval Station Sangley Point and Naval Base Cavite are declared permanent US bases. All the auxiliary Airfields are abandoned shortly after the war. The Philippines became independent on July 4, 1946. USS General C. G. Morton (AP-138) and other ships help in the return of Manila World War II Troops after the war, called Operation Magic Carpet. Naval Base Manila and its weather station were used to support the US Seventh Fleet, the Korean War and Vietnam War. After the 1970 Philippine Constitutional Convention election and other events in the Philippines, the bases at Naval Base Manila closed on July 1, 1971. The US Navy did not need three bases on Luzon Island so the two smaller Naval Base at Manila were closed. Philippine Navy was trained on the use of the base. On 1 September 1971, the US Manila Naval Bases and Naval Hospital were turned over to the Philippine Navy, ending 73 years of US Navy use. Some of the equipment and all the Troops were transferred to U.S. Naval Base Subic Bay on Luzon and other bases.

Manila American Cemetery, most US World War II graves at one Cemetery, 17,206 on 152-acres.
Filipino-Chinese World War II Martyrs Memorial, in Binondo at 
The Japanese Garden Cemetery in Muntinlupa, with site of General Tomoyuki Yamashita grave.
Memorial Hill, in Muntinlupa, a small hill in Bilibid Prison, grave of Eriberto Misa the Prisons Director (1937–1949) and a Japanese 120mm gun.
Zero Km.
Rock Force Memorial Corregidor, on Corregidor at

Gallery

See also

US Naval Base Philippines
Naval Station San Miguel
Fort Drum (Philippines)
Camp Aguinaldo
Camp Crame
Cavite National High School
Fort San Felipe (Cavite)
USS Isabel
Asiatic Squadron
Women of Valor
List of memorials to Bataan Death March victims

External links
youtube Cavite Naval Base
youtube Manila Bay, Cavite Naval Base Hit by US Navy 
youtube Sangley Pt Philippines 1960s
youtube  Seabees of World War II

References 

Military facilities in Metro Manila
Military installations of the Philippines
Military installations established in 1989
Military facilities in Cavite
Buildings and structures in Cavite City
Closed installations of the United States Navy